The Sum of All Fears is a 2002 American spy thriller film directed by Phil Alden Robinson, based on Tom Clancy's 1991 novel of the same name. The film, which is set in the Jack Ryan film series, is a reboot taking place in 2002. Jack Ryan is portrayed as a younger character by Ben Affleck, in comparison with the previous films: The Hunt for Red October (1990) starring Alec Baldwin as Jack Ryan and the sequels, Patriot Games (1992) and Clear and Present Danger (1994), both starring Harrison Ford in the role.

An Austrian Neo-Nazi plans to trigger a nuclear war between the United States and Russia, so that he can establish a fascist superstate in Europe. After the Neo-Nazi's scientists build a secret nuclear weapon that is detonated in Baltimore, and a rogue Russian officer paid off by the Neo-Nazi attacks a U.S. aircraft carrier, the world's superpowers are pushed close to the brink of war. CIA analyst Jack Ryan (Affleck) is the only person who realizes that the Baltimore bomb was a black market weapon, not a Russian one. With the clock ticking, Ryan has to find a way to stop the impending nuclear war.

The film was a co-production between the motion picture studios of Paramount Pictures, Mace Neufeld Productions, MFP Munich Film Partners, and S.O.A.F. Productions. On June 4, 2002, the original motion picture soundtrack was released by the Elektra Records music label. The soundtrack was composed and orchestrated by musician Jerry Goldsmith. The movie premiered in theaters in the United States on May 31, 2002.

The Sum of All Fears received generally mixed reviews from critics. It is considered a major financial success, having a worldwide theatrical run of $193.9 million compared to its production budget of $68 million and related marketing costs.

Plot
In 1973, during the Yom Kippur War, an Israeli warplane carrying a nuclear bomb is shot down. In 2002, a Syrian scrap collector uncovers a large unexploded bomb buried in a field in the Golan Heights. He sells it to a South African black market arms trafficker named Olson, who recognizes it as the nuclear bomb that was lost during that war. He then sells it to a neo-nazi group led by Austrian billionaire Richard Dressler, whose aim is to start a war between the United States and Russia that will devastate them both, and leave a united fascist Europe to rule the world.

CIA analyst Jack Ryan is summoned by CIA Director William Cabot to accompany him to Moscow to meet new Russian President Nemerov. There, Cabot and Ryan are allowed to examine a Russian nuclear weapons facility as prescribed by the START treaty, where Ryan notices the absence of three scientists listed on the facility's roster. After receiving reliable intelligence from a confidential secure informant inside the Kremlin, codenamed "Spinnaker", Cabot sends operative John Clark to Russia to investigate. Clark tracks the missing scientists to a former Soviet military facility in Ukraine, where Cabot suspects they are building a secret nuclear weapon that Russia could use without any method to trace it back to them; relations between the U.S. and Russia are strained due to Russia's war in Chechnya.

Ryan and his colleagues discern that a crate from the facility in Ukraine was flown to the Canary Islands, then sent to Baltimore on a cargo ship. Ryan warns Cabot, who is attending a football game in the city with U.S. President Fowler, about a bomb threat. Fowler is evacuated before the bomb detonates, but the stadium is destroyed and Cabot is mortally wounded. Worsening matters, a corrupt Russian Air Force general who has been paid by Dressler sends warplanes to attack the American aircraft carrier , heavily damaging it and leading the U.S. to believe that Russia perpetrated the nuclear bombing.

Ryan learns from a radiation assessment team that the isotopic signature from the nuclear blast indicates it was manufactured in the U.S., evidence which seems to exonerate Russia. In Syria, Clark tracks down Ghazi, one of the men who found the bomb, now dying of radiation exposure. He tells Clark that he sold the bomb to Olson, who lives in Damascus. Ryan's colleagues at Langley infiltrate Olson's computer and download files that implicate Dressler as the person who bought the plutonium and who is behind the nuclear attack.

Ryan is able to reach the National Military Command Center in The Pentagon and get a message to Nemerov, saying that he knows that Russia was not behind the attack, while also asking Nemerov to stand down his forces as a show of good faith. Nemerov agrees to do so as Fowler follows suit. The participants in the conspiracy, including Olson and Dressler, are assassinated. Fowler and Nemerov announce new measures to counter nuclear proliferation in joint speeches at the White House, as Ryan and his fiancée Dr. Catherine Muller listen in. Spinnaker, who is revealed to be Nemerov's Senior Advisor Grushkov, gives Catherine a modest gift for their engagement.

Cast

Production

Development
In 1991, Paramount Pictures negotiated with Tom Clancy for the rights to adapt The Sum of All Fears, but the talks stalled after he became reluctant to concede film rights to further works due to his dissatisfaction with the adaptation of Patriot Games. Clancy ultimately agreed after he reached a large cash settlement with the studio president Brandon Tartikoff. However, producer Mace Neufeld was not enthusiastic to adapt the book after the release of Clear and Present Danger in 1994 due to its similarities with the story of Black Sunday and concerns over depicting controversial subjects such as terrorism and the Israeli–Palestinian conflict. A year was spent developing Tom Clancy's The Cardinal of the Kremlin before the material was deemed too difficult to adapt. An adaptation of Debt of Honor or a new screenplay unrelated to any of Clancy's books was also considered.

In October 1999, Harrison Ford announced that the next Jack Ryan novel being scripted into a film would indeed be The Sum of All Fears and that "hopefully we'll get that to a place where we can make a movie." During this time, writer Akiva Goldsman wrote multiple drafts of the script. However, on June 8, 2000, it was announced that Ford had dropped out of the film after he and director Phillip Noyce were unable to work out script problems. It was later announced that Ben Affleck would take on the role in a $10 million deal that would see the series rebooted with Jack Ryan portrayed at an earlier stage in life. "The day I received the offer to play Jack Ryan, I was filming a Pearl Harbor scene with Alec Baldwin. He was very sweet and said I should do it," said Affleck. "I wouldn't have done the movie without talking to Harrison Ford first. He gave me his blessing. That's what I needed to hear." Months after Affleck became attached to the project, director Phil Alden Robinson was brought on to lead it.

While the basic plot is the same in the movie as in the book, there were significant changes. Noting these substantial changes, in the commentary track on the DVD release, Tom Clancy jokingly introduced himself as "the author of the book that he [director Phil Alden Robinson, who is present with Clancy] ignored" and spending most of the commentary poking fun at the film's factual inaccuracies and differences from the source material. Perhaps the largest change were the original terrorists. In the novel, they were Arab nationalists, but in the film, they were changed to neo-Nazis. A common misconception is that this was done as a reaction to the September 11, 2001, attacks, but the movie finished filming in June 2001.

On the "making-of" DVD extra, director Alden Robinson said that the change was purely for elements relating to the plot, because Arab terrorists would not be able to plausibly accomplish all that was necessary for the story to work. In addition, the terrorists in the book received significant aid from elements in East Germany, a country which had ceased to exist before the novel was even published. The group Council on American-Islamic Relations (CAIR) did mount a two-year lobbying campaign that ended on January 26, 2001, against using "Muslim villains", as the original book version did.

Screenwriter Dan Pyne claimed that the decision to not use Arab terrorists was "possibly because that has become a cliché. At the time that I started writing The Sum of All Fears, Jörg Haider was just starting to come into play in Austria. And simultaneous with that, I think, there was some neo-nationalist activity in Holland, and there was stuff going on in Spain and in Italy. So it seemed like a logical and lasting idea that would be universal." It has also been noted that a larger percent of profits stems from international audiences, and US filmmakers work to avoid alienating large segments of this customer base.

Filming
Principal photography for The Sum of All Fears began on February 12, 2001, in Montreal, Quebec. A majority of the film was shot in Montreal, including the sequences at the football game that were shot in the city's Olympic Stadium. Additional filming was done at the Diefenbunker in Ottawa, Ontario. Production finished in June 2001. The interior scene of the aircraft carrier USS John C. Stennis was filmed on a set used in the television series JAG.

Music
The musical score to The Sum of All Fears is composed by Jerry Goldsmith. A soundtrack album was released on June 4, 2002, by Elektra Records. In addition to Goldsmith's score, the soundtrack also includes source music such as "If We Get Through This" by Tabitha Fair and "Nessun dorma" by Giacomo Puccini. There are also two tracks from the album ("If We Could Remember" and "The Mission") that are vocal interpretations of Goldsmith's primary theme co-written by singer-songwriter Paul Williams. On March 12, 2014, an expanded edition was released by La-La Land Records.

Release

While the film was speculated to be released in late 2001, The Sum of All Fears was theatrically released on May 31, 2002. Many media outlets characterized this apparent change in release date to be a delay due to the September 11 attacks. Addressing the release date, director Phil Alden Robinson said, "When I came on board in August of 2000, they said, 'This is a Summer-of-2002 picture.'" As the first film released since September 11 to deal so vividly with terrorism, critics believed it to be too alarming to be released nine months after the attacks.

Reception

Critical response
The Sum of All Fears received mixed reviews. Rotten Tomatoes reported that 60% of critics gave the film positive reviews and that the average rating was 5.95/10 based on a total of 176 reviews counted. The consensus was that the film was "A slick and well-made thriller that takes on new weight due to the current political climate." At Metacritic, which assigns a weighted average out of 100 to critics' reviews, The Sum of All Fears received a score of 45 based on 35 reviews.

Peter Travers criticized Affleck's performance, saying it "merely creates an outline for a role he still needs to grow into, a role that Harrison Ford effortlessly filled with authority." Richard Roeper felt the film "is almost impossible to follow – and there's something cringe-inducing about seeing an American football stadium nuked as pop entertainment." Michael Wilmington of the Chicago Tribune called it "an implausible apocalypse without depth or resonance", while Peter Rainer of New York magazine felt the "movie has been upstaged by the sum of our fears."

A few positive reviews came from The Argus, who praised Freeman for giving "the William Cabot character such validity." Roger Ebert awarded the film 3.5 out of 4, stars and felt that "the use of the neo-Nazis is politically correct: Best to invent villains who won't offend any audiences." He also said that "Jack Ryan's one-man actions in post-bomb Baltimore are unlikely and way too well-timed." Ebert was not alone in disparaging the recasting of the novel's Arab terrorist villains as Neo-Nazis.

In Reel Power: Hollywood Cinema and American Supremacy, author Matthew Alford observed that the American political characters in the film act benevolently, declaring "When the President and his advisers do apply force it is with heavy hearts and purely as a way of demonstrating 'deterrence' in the hope that this will encourage the Russians to back down. They never apply excessive violence and are ultimately with Ryan’s in avoiding nuclear warfare."  Furthermore, he argued that "the film celebrates and makes light of the enormous covert powers of a globally operating US national security state and its allies."

Ed Gonzalez of Slant magazine took issue with the film's violent content, especially as it was released not long after the September 11 terrorist attacks in the US.

Box office
The Sum of All Fears made $31.1 million during its opening weekend, ranking in first place at the box office, beating Star Wars: Episode II – Attack of the Clones. According to Box Office Mojo, the film made U.S. $118,907,036 and $75,014,336 in foreign totals, easily recovering its $68 million production costs.

Awards
The film won a Visual Effects Society Award for "Best Supporting Visual Effects in a Motion Picture."  The recipients were Glenn Neufeld, Derek Spears, Dan Malvin, and Al DiSarro.

See also

 2002 in film
 The Sum of All Fears (video game)
 National Response Scenario Number One

References

External links 

 
 
 
 
 
 

2002 films
2002 action thriller films
2000s spy thriller films
American action thriller films
American political thriller films
Films about neo-Nazism
Films about nuclear war and weapons
Films about terrorism
Films based on American novels
Films based on military novels
Films based on works by Tom Clancy
Films directed by Phil Alden Robinson
Films postponed due to the September 11 attacks
Films produced by Mace Neufeld
Films scored by Jerry Goldsmith
Films set in 1973
Films set in 2002
Films set in Baltimore
Films set in Russia
Films set in Ukraine
Films shot in Moscow
Films shot in Montreal
Films shot in Ottawa
Films shot in Baltimore
Films with screenplays by Paul Attanasio
Paramount Pictures films
Reboot films
Ryanverse films
Ukrainian-language films
2000s English-language films
2000s American films